Tissue-to-air ratio (TAR) is a term used in radiotherapy treatment planning to help calculate absorbed dose to water in conditions other than those directly measured.

Definition
The TAR at a point in a water phantom irradiated by a photon beam is taken to be the ratio of the total absorbed dose at that point to the absorbed dose at the same point in a minimal-scatter phantom with just-sufficient build-up.

Tissue-air ratio is defined as the ratio of the dose to water at a given depth to the dose in air measured with a buildup cap: 

where D(f,z) is the dose at a given depth z and distance focus-detector f; and D(f,0) is the dose in air (z=0). 

 TAR increases with increasing beam energy because higher energy radiation is more penetrating
 TAR decreases with depth because of attenuation
 TAR increases with field size due to increased scatter contribution 

Measurements for each are taken using an ion chamber for identical source to detector distances and field sizes.

See also
 Dosimetry
 Percentage depth dose curve

References

Radiation therapy
Medical physics